Granular, or Granular Linux, is a Linux distribution targeted at the common desktop users. Granular is based on PCLinuxOS and comes as an installable live CD. The CD version of Granular features two desktop environments - KDE and a development version of Enlightenment. Where KDE is a full-featured desktop environment, Enlightenment is a lightweight desktop shell which is markedly faster than KDE.

History 
Granular has its roots in India. The Granular Linux Project kicked off in October 2006, when its first demonstration was given to some college students. The first release that was made available for download on 30 December 2006.

The main idea behind the birth of the project, was to redefine the application set included in PCLinuxOS to some extent and to introduce the idea of having more than one major desktop environment on a single LiveCD. The latter idea was implemented beginning from the second version release of Granular - version 0.25 - where two desktop environments (KDE and Xfce) were included, KDE being highly customizable and feature-rich but resource heavy, and Xfce being a light-weight yet feature-full desktop environment.

After v0.25, came out v0.90, and finally v1.0. Granular 1.0 (code name Esto Vox) was the last of the "Esto" series; the first was 0.90 (Esto Vello).

In October 2007, a special DVD edition of Granular 0.90 was released with the name "FunWorks", which featured the LG3D desktop environment along with three others and a host of many other software and games.

Granular utilizes the PCLinuxOS repository and its own as well for software/package management. Granular's own repository was opened in March 2008, and since then, it has been a source of all Granular-specific RPM packages, some of which are not available in the PCLinuxOS repository.

Features 
Granular comes as a LiveCD, which means you don't have to install it to try it. The standard CD version of Granular includes two desktop environments - KDE and Enlightenment 17. Like PCLinuxOS, Granular uses Synaptic Package Manager, a GUI frontend to APT, for package management (installing, updating, or removing packages). Granular comes with a Perl-based script mklivecd which makes it possible to remaster Granular or create a backup CD/DVD out of the installed system. It also included Granular StartPoint, which is a HTML-based and acts as a primer to the various major software included in Granular.

Official website
In the beginning a news website was launched on 5 December, under the domain http://www.granular-linux.com/main/.  Later, the main website was shifted to another server under a new domain name. The present website address is: http://www.granularlinux.com/. Later, the main website migrated once again to https://web.archive.org/web/20150211172703/http://linux.granularproject.org/

References

External links

 Granular Linux website
 Granular Project website
 

Live USB
RPM-based Linux distributions
Operating system distributions bootable from read-only media
Linux distributions